Trudi Walend was a Republican member of the North Carolina House of Representatives who represented the 113th district (and the preceding 68th district) (including constituents in Henderson, Polk and Transylvania counties) from her election in 1998 until her retirement in 2009. She was then appointed to the seat again in 2012 to fill the vacancy caused by the resignation of Rep. David Guice. When she ran for a new full term, she was defeated by a narrow margin in the May 2012 Republican primary.

A businessperson in Brevard, North Carolina, Walend at one time held the position of House Republican Whip.

Committee assignments

2012-2013 session
Appropriations 
Appropriations - Justice and Public Safety
Judiciary (Vice Chair)
Agriculture 
Government
State Personnel

Electoral history

2012

2006

2004

2002

2000

References

External links
North Carolina General Assembly official site

|-

|-

Living people
1943 births
People from Brevard, North Carolina
Western Carolina University alumni
20th-century American politicians
21st-century American politicians
20th-century American women politicians
21st-century American women politicians
Women state legislators in North Carolina
Republican Party members of the North Carolina House of Representatives